Fiss is a municipality in the Landeck district in the Austrian state of Tyrol located  south of Landeck on the upper course of the Inn River. The main source of income is tourism.

Population

References

Cities and towns in Landeck District